José Ángel González Sainz (born 1956) is a Spanish writer, translator and academic. Born in Soria, he studied philology in Barcelona and has since lived in Madrid, Venice and Trieste. Since 1982, he has taught in Italy, and has translated various Italian writers and intellectuals such as Emmanuele Severino, Guido Ceronetti, Daniele Del Giudice, Giani Stuparich, and notably his friend Claudio Magris. In 1988, he founded the cultural magazine Archipelago, which he jointly ran until 2002 (the publication disappeared in 2008). He has also contributed to various newspapers and magazines such as El País, El Mundo, etc.

The author of half a dozen books, he won the Premio Herralde in 1995 for his novel Un mundo exasperado.

Selected works
 El viento en las hojas 
 Ojos que no ven
 Los encuentros
 Un mundo exasperado
 Volver al mundo 
 Ojos que no ven

References

Spanish writers
1956 births
Living people